All You Need Is Luv' is the final studio album by Dutch girl group Luv' released in 1994 by Roman Disc and only available in Kruidvat stores in the Netherlands. It was reissued in 1995 and 2021.

History
In 1993, the original Luv' trio (José Hoebee, Patty Brard and Marga Scheide) made a comeback. Their Luv' Gold (1993) compilation sold 40.000 copies in the Netherlands and Belgium. They went on a promo tour through Benelux, Germany, Switzerland and Denmark. In late 1993, Luv' decided to record new material. Piet Souer and Martin Duiser assisted by Koen van Baal supervised the recording sessions. Souer is familiar to the group's public as Hans van Hemert and he wrote the whole Luv' repertoire in their heyday. Duiser was an acclaimed artist as he was involved in the world-famous Stars on 45 productions. Souer and Duiser had already teamed up in the 1980s to produce popular Dutch artists (including Anita Meyer). Keyboard player Koen van Baal had a career as an arranger and a session musician (for successful acts like German band Scorpions and Marco Borsato).

All You Need Is Luv consists of thirteen tracks recorded in the Bolland studios (owned by the duo Bolland & Bolland) in Blaricum. The aim of this album was to conform to the popular music genres of the mid 1990s. Souer and Duiser wrote nine original tracks and Van Baal two songs. Luv' rendered "All You Need Is Love" (originally performed by The Beatles) in a reggae oriented tempo. Some songs were performed in a Eurodance style: "Don't Stop Now", "One More Night", "I Cried You Outta My Heart", and "Let's Go to the Paradise of Love". Another composition, "Your Love", had a Contemporary R&B influence. Other songs, including "Bad Reputation" and "Big Time Spender", had Pop rock elements. "No Johnny No Can Do" was a tribute to Luv's camp and latino style of their debut. The final track was a Dance medley of their greatest hits "U.O.Me", "You're the Greatest Lover", "Casanova" and "My Number One".

The album was released by Roman Disc and only available in Kruidvat shops (a Dutch chain of drugstores). Because of this limited distribution, it did not enter the album charts. One year later, it was re-issued by Rondo Music/Pink Records with a new title: "One More Night". 

On April 2nd, 2021, Dutch independent label Hit It! Music reissued the album on digital platforms (Apple Music, YouTube, Amazon Music, Deezer and Spotify).

Track listing
All tracks written by Piet Souer & Martin Duiserunder, except where noted.

"All You Need Is Love" (John Lennon & Paul McCartney) – 4:15
"Don't Stop Now" – 3:24
"Everything's Gonna Be Allright" – 4:00
"Shine On" – 3:28
"One More Night" (Koen van Baal) – 3:45
"I Cried You Outta My Heart" – 6:10
"You Love" (Koen van Baal) – 4:23
"Let's Go to the Paradise of Love" – 4:00
"Bad Reputation" – 3:22
"No Johnny, No Can Do" – 3:38
"Big Time Spender" – 3:00
"Break" – 4:00
"Medley" (including "U.O.Me" / "You're the Greatest Lover" / "Casanova" / "My Number One") (Janschen & Janschens) – 4:00

Personnel
Luv'
 José Hoebee – vocals
 Marga Scheide – vocals
 Patty Brard – vocals

Production
 Produced by Piet Souer and Martin Duiser.
 Arranged by Koen van Baal except "Don't Stop Now" and "Big Time Spender" arranged by Piet Souer.
 Recorded at M.D.P and Bolland Studios, Blaricum, Netherlands.
 Mixed by Piet Souer, Martin Duiser and Okkie Huysdens

Design
 Cover Design: Henk-Jan Voordes

References

External links
 Luv' - All You Need Is Luv' (1994) album releases & credits at Discogs

1994 albums
Luv' albums